The 2013 Valdresekspressen hijacking was a hijacking of an express bus running on the Nor-Way Bussekspress Valdresekspressen (Valdres Express) route, which took place east of Øvre Årdal on 4 November 2013. The driver and both passengers were killed.

Events
The bus was travelling on Nor-Way Bussekspress' long-distance Valdresekspressen route between Årdalstangen and Oslo when it was hijacked at about 5.30 pm on Fylkesvei 53 between Øvre Årdal, a village in the municipality of Årdal in Vestland county, and Tyin in the neighbouring municipality of Vang in Innlandet county. The driver and both passengers were killed with a knife. The suspect gave himself up voluntarily; he had self-inflicted knife wounds and was taken to a hospital.

Wrongly thinking a tunnel was closed, the police took over an hour to drive to the isolated location; the situation was initially reported as a road accident, and before emergency responders arrived, some passersby had tried unsuccessfully to persuade the man to open the door.

The fire brigade and ambulance service arrived on the scene before the police and captured the suspect. Counter-terrorism police had been alerted but were called off after the suspect was taken into custody.

Suspect and victims

Suspect
The suspected hijacker was a man from South Sudan born in 1982 who had applied for asylum in Norway in April 2013. The application was turned down in June on the basis that he had previously applied for asylum in Spain. He was settled in Årdal in August. He hijacked the bus the day before he was to be returned to Spain. However, according to authorities, he had not been informed that he was about to be deported.

According to Frode Forfang, director of the Norwegian Directorate of Immigration, the man stated in an interview with the police upon arrival in Norway that he had psychiatric problems and cited health problems as grounds for seeking asylum in Norway. The authorities had not considered that his behaviour raised security concerns.

In September 2014, he died from injuries sustained from jumping off a roof in prison.

Victims
 Margaret Molland Sanden, 19, of Årdalstangen, a student at Oslo University College
 Brahim Khouya, 53, a Swedish citizen returning home to Gothenburg after working in Årdal
 Arve Kvernhaug, 55, of Bagn, the bus driver

Investigation and judicial proceedings
The suspect was held at a psychiatric clinic in Bergen and was scheduled to undergo a preliminary hearing with the Criminal Investigation Service on 14 November, but declined to answer questions at that time.  he has still not made a statement to police, has been held in prison and under observation in a medical facility, and is expected to be tried in autumn 2014.

Reactions
Following the triple homicide, there were reports of insults to other asylum-seekers living at the centre in Årdal, and the local affiliate of Nor-Way Bussekspress made an agreement with the centre operator that asylum-seekers would not travel on that route for a week, for the drivers' sake. Some demanded psychiatric screening of asylum-seekers.

On the afternoon of 16 November 2013, Prime Minister Erna Solberg visited Årdal and laid down flowers and lit candles to commemorate the victims of the triple homicide.

The police were criticised for taking so long to reach the scene; there have been calls for a national minimum standard response time and other changes. On 16 November the Norwegian Broadcasting Corporation published a report by the district police chief, Ronny Iden.

2003 hijacking
An earlier hijacking on the Valdresekspressen took place on 16 February 2003; a 26-year-old Ethiopian man killed the driver, 39-year-old Audun Bøland, and wounded some of the 34 passengers. He had previously killed an asylum-seeker at an asylum centre in Fagernes.

References

2013 murders in Norway
Årdal
Hijacking
Bus transport in Norway
Refugees in Norway
Knife attacks
Mass stabbings in Europe
Stabbing attacks in 2013
November 2013 crimes in Europe
Stabbing attacks in Europe